Abby Dunford (born January 2, 2006) is a Canadian–American swimmer, currently swimming for Las Vegas-based swim team Sandpipers of Nevada. She swam in the 2022 World Aquatics Championships in the women's 1,500m preliminary heats, finishing 17th, not qualifying for the final. She would also swim the open water 5km and 10km events, finishing 31st and 38th respectively. She is also scheduled to swim at the 2022 Commonwealth Games.

Career

Early career 
In December 2017, while Dunford was 11 years old and swimming for Tiger Aquatics, she would break the 11–12 girls Louisiana state record, which had stood for 41 years, for the 500m freestyle by more than a second with a time of 5:06.24. She would go on to say "I was really shocked. I really wanted the record. It was great. I was so happy."

2021 
In 2021, Dunford aimed to compete for Canada at the 2020 Summer Olympics in the women's 1,500m freestyle, but came up short of the Olympics qualifying time, finishing six seconds behind. According to Dunford, COVID-19 protocols during the pandemic affected her training when she returned to Canada.

2022: World Aquatics Championships 
At the Canadian Swimming Trials 2022, the Canadian qualifying event for 2022 World Aquatics Championships, she would win the gold metal in the event, earning a time of 16:20.26, knocking her personal best time by 18 seconds.

Personal life 
Dunford, asides from swimming, also does track and field. She is currently living with her mother, Lianne Crawford.

References

External links 

 Abby Dunford at Swimcloud
 Abby Dunford at Swimming Canada
 Abby Dunford at FINA

2006 births
Living people
Canadian female freestyle swimmers
21st-century Canadian women
Sportspeople from Louisiana
Canadian female swimmers